Castle Rushen High School is a co-educational secondary state school located in Castletown on the Isle of Man for pupils from the south of the island and from the nearby Parish the Calf of Man.

Isle of Man school system

The Isle of Man has six secondary schools. The other comprehensive schools are St Ninian's High School, Ballakermeen High School, Ramsey Grammar School and Queen Elizabeth II High School. There is one private (fee-paying) school, King William's College.

The House System
The pupils of the school are grouped into four houses named after headlands or rocks in the south of the island: Bradda, Carrick, Langness and Scarlett. Houses compete in a number of events in the year ranging from sporting events such as inter-house rugby, cross country and netball to more academic competition in the form of a merit award system for good work. There are four trophies available each year for "Sport", "Merits", and "Attendance", and the overall best house trophy which is awarded to the house which does best over the other three categories.

Notable alumni
James Anthony Brown – former Chief Minister of the Isle of Man
 Sir Miles Walker – first Chief Minister of the Isle of Man
 Juan Watterson – Speaker of the House of Keys

References

External links
Castle Rushen High School

Schools in the Isle of Man

Secondary schools on the Isle of Man